"Ain't Nuttin' But Music" is a hip hop single by American rap group D12, taken as the third cut from their debut studio album, Devil's Night. It achieved notable success in France and Belgium, peaking at #25 and #47 respectively. The single was only released in the two countries. The single was backed with the group's previous single, "Purple Pills", which was not released as a single in France or Belgium due to the outlandish content of its lyrics.

Track listing
French CD single

French CD single

US 12" Vinyl

Notes
 signifies an additional producer.

Charts

References

2000 songs
2001 singles
D12 songs
Eminem songs
Song recordings produced by Dr. Dre
Song recordings produced by Scott Storch
Songs written by Eminem
Songs written by Scott Storch
Songs written by Dr. Dre
Songs written by Mike Elizondo
Songs written by Denaun Porter
Horrorcore songs
Songs written by Bizarre (rapper)